Eutrichillus brevipilus is a species of longhorn beetles of the subfamily Lamiinae. It was described by Chemsak and Linsley in 1986, and is known from northwestern Mexico.

References

Beetles described in 1986
Endemic insects of Mexico
Acanthocinini